Holstenau is a small river of Schleswig-Holstein, Germany. Its course has been intersected by the Kiel Canal in several places.

See also
List of rivers of Schleswig-Holstein

Rivers of Schleswig-Holstein
Tributaries of the Kiel Canal
Rivers of Germany